Zavoloka (full name, Kateryna Zavoloka) is a contemporary experimental music and electronic music composer, sound artist, improviser, performer and graphic designer from Kyiv, the capital of Ukraine. She was born in 1981.

The word zavoloka means deep fog and also maverick in Ukrainian. Zavoloka's main interests in music are to mix ancient Ukrainian traditions with modern electronic music technology. She combines melodic experimental electronic music with self-recorded Ukrainian folk music.

Career
In 2003, the Nexsound label released her first album Suspenzia. At the end of 2003 the CD "I" appeared on the American label Zeromoon.

Her full-length CD "Plavyna" was debuted at the beginning of 2005 under the Austrian label Laton and under the Ukrainian label Nexsound. The CD took an honorary mention at the Prix Ars Electronica in 2005.

In the June 2007 issue of The Wire (magazine)  there was an article detailing Zavoloka's music. In addition, one collaborative track with Kotra appeared on the magazine's Wire Tapper 16 and her solo composition "Inhale", from Viter, was featured on the Wire Tapper 20.

In 2011 Zavoloka released "Vedana" CD and in 2007 Viter on the label Kvitnu, 2 of the series of albums dedicated to Elements of Air, Water, Earth and Fire.

In 2008 Zavoloka received the "Gaude Polonia" grant, hosted by National Centre for Culture, Ministry of Culture in Poland, and worked at the Electroacoustic Studio at the Cracow Music Academy. She has also worked at the different studios, including EMS in Stockholm, Sweden and the [[Groupe de Recherches Musicales|INA-GRM studio]] in Paris.

Zavoloka is a graphic designer for Kvitnu, also has designed works for the Detali Zvuku festival, Kvitnu Fest, for Seefeel "Seefeel" album, "Faults" EP and others.

 Collaborations Kotra - Ukrainian musician, sound artist, runner of label Kvitnu, Kvitnu Fest and Detali Zvuku festival. Kotra & Zavoloka have several releases on Ukrainian label Kvitnu in 2006, and often perform live together. Their track, Cool Eyes, appeared on the Wire Tapper 16 CD release.Mark Clifford - (from Seefeel, label Polyfusia, Warp records) Musician from the UK. In 2007 they released Split01 EP on Polyfusia Records.AGF -  a.k.a. Antye Greie, German poet and musician. In 2006 they released the full-length CD Nature Never Produces the Same Beat Twice on Nexsound and performed at a series of European music festivals that same year.
 Laetitia Morais -  visual artist from Portugal. Laetitia Morais made a music video for Zavoloka's "Exhale" track, featured on Viter.Anders Dahl - Swedish musician from the Hapna label. Zavoloka and Anders Dahl participated in the SWIZHE project, hosted by the Swedish Institute from 2006 to 2007.Katya Chilly - Ukrainian vocalist. They performed several live concerts together, and collaborated in making the music for a "Krashen Vechir" video.
 Zavoloka also took part the multimedia Move project' with: Johannes Burstrom (Sweden) - musician, bassist, sound artist and web designer,  Tobias Leira (Norway) - lighting designer and video artist,  Charlotta Ruth (Sweden) and Alexandr Andriyashkin (Russia) - contemporary choreographers and dancers.

 Live performance 

Zavoloka performs live regularly and has played at many international music festivals around the world like: Presences Electronique (Groupe de Recherches Musicales, INA-GRM), club transmediale
, Kvitnu Fest, Madeiradig, Unsound NYC, Detali Zvuku festival, Being the Future, Les Urbaines, Stimul, Garage, Unsound, Femmes, Cimatics, Interferenze, Radius, Nuit Bleue, EME07, AudioVisiva and others.

In 2011 Zavoloka was specially invited by Aphex Twin (UK) to support his audiovisual rave shows in UK and Denmark.

 Discography 

2003 Zavoloka "Suspenzia" (Digital download), Nexsound
2004 Zavoloka "I" (CDr 3"), Zeromoon
2005 Zavoloka "Plavyna" (CD / Digital download), Nexsound/Laton
2005 Zavoloka "Suspenzia" (CD / Digital download), Nexsound
2005 Zavoloka & Kotra "Untitled Live" (CDr), Live Reports
2006 Zavoloka "Nata" (Digital download), Surreal Madrid
2006 Zavoloka versus Kotra "To kill the tiny groovy cat" (CD / Digital download), Nexsound
2006 Zavoloka-Agf "Nature Never Produces The Same Beat Twice" (CD / Digital download), Nexsound
2006 Kotra & Zavoloka "Wag the Swing" (CD / Digital download), Kvitnu
2007 Mark Clifford & Zavoloka "Split01" (CD / Digital download), Polyfusia
2007 Zavoloka "Viter" (CD / Digital download), Kvitnu
2011 Zavoloka "Svitlo" (Digital download), Kvitnu
2011 Zavoloka "Vedana" (CD enhanced / Digital download), Kvitnu
2012 Kotra&Zavoloka&Dunaewsky69 "Kallista" (CD / Digital download), Kvitnu
2014 Zavoloka "Volya" (CD / Digital download), Kvitnu
2017 Zavoloka "Syngonia" (CD / Digital download / Vinyl), Kvitnu

 Tracks in compilations 

Metropolitan Fairytales (CD) Trrrr, Underground Mov..., Innertion
Aout 2005 (MP3) Accuracy, Off & Green Project
Prix Ars Electronica Cd Compilation, track "Kolyskova", taken from "Plavyna" Cd, 2005.
Culmination (2xCD) Mood Laton
Music 2 Fall Asleep 2 (MP3) Nathennia Zerinnerung
Nexsound Sampler #2 (CDr) Rankova Nexsound
VA (MP3) Lychko Rumjanilo Telescope
Europa (MP3) Temna Nichka (Vocal Fo... Plex Records)
Post Awakening Sound (MP3) Nebo Skyapnea
 the Wire Tapper 16, Kotra & Zavoloka, Cool eyes"Tetroid po dolynah", track for "Tetroid" mp3 compilation, 2008
Zavoloka's track "Dzvenity" (vocal by Danya Chekun) on 12 inch vinyl, release of Surreal Madrid label, "Kill the headliners!" compilation. 2007
ZAVOLOKA'S track in MEDIATERRAE vol.1 DVD, with BLOWUP magazine. 2007
"CHAIN-MUSIC", Zavoloka's track for Ryuichi Sakamoto's compilation. 2007
2008 Zavoloka/Laetitia Video "Exhale"V/A "High Blood Pressure" (Audio/Video CDr), Kvitnu
 The Wire Tapper 20, Zavoloka Inhale,	Wire Magazine, 2008
 Tetroid 2012'', Entity
 "Gorogoro Garagara Rimikkusu", "Kodomo" - Zavoloka remix for Gurun Gurun, vocal by Aki Tomita, Home Normal, 2010
 "The Morning Line", "Volution" - vinyl compilation for "The Morning Line" project, with catalogue, 2011
 "Myths&Masks of Karol Szymanowski by Ukrainian sound artists", track "Anxiety", CD compilation, Kvitnu 2011

Awards
Zavoloka "Plavyna" (CD) was honorary mentioned at the Prix Ars Electronica in 2005.

See also 
 label Kvitnu

References

 http://www.zavoloka.com
 http://www.kvitnu.com

External links
 Zavoloka official web-site

Ukrainian electronic musicians
Experimental musicians
Sound artists
Women sound artists
Visual music
Digital artists
Psychedelic musicians
Women in electronic music